Verdigris Township, Nebraska may refer to the following places:

Verdigris Township, Antelope County, Nebraska
Verdigris Township, Holt County, Nebraska

See also
Verdigris Township (disambiguation)

Nebraska township disambiguation pages